Capitaine Pantoufle is a French comedy film of 1953, directed by Guy Lefranc, written by Alfred Adam, starring Madeleine Lebeau and Louis de Funès. The scenario was based on the work of Alfred Adam – "Many".

Cast 
 François Périer : Emmanuel Bonnavent, second-in-command of the bank
 Louis de Funès : Mr. Rachoux, the director of bank
 Marthe Mercadier : Claire Bonnavent, wife of Emmanuel
 Michèle Monty : Carmen, the prostitute
 Noël Roquevert : Mr. Cauchard, the father of Claire
 Jane Marken : Mrs Cauchard, mother of Claire
 Jean Brochard : M. Lesurpied, a colleague of Emmanuel
 Dominique Page : Zite
 Pierre Mondy : Henri
 Françoise Spira : the russet lady
 Judith Magre : the companion of Carmen
 Paul Faivre : Mr. Charnudet, the cashier of the bank
 Léonce Corne : the doctor
 Maguy Horiot : the cashier of café
 Richard Francoeur : Mr. Lamberjeton
 Jacques Jouanneau : The barman of Goéland
 Alain Poiré

References

External links 
 
 Capitaine Pantoufle (1953) at the Films de France

1953 films
French comedy films
1950s French-language films
French black-and-white films
Films directed by Guy Lefranc
1953 comedy films
1950s French films